Medin may refer to the following people:
Given name
Medin Zhega, Albanian football striker

Surname
Tomo Medin (1725-1788), Serbian author and adventurer
Douglas Medin (born 1944), American psychologist
Gastone Medin (1905–1973), Italian art director
 Karl Oskar Medin (1847–1927), Swedish pediatrician
Mykola Medin (born 1972), Ukrainian football coach and a former player

See also
Medina (surname)
Jānis Mediņš (1890–1966), Latvian composer